The Food Group is a children's book series by American author Jory John, illustrated by Pete Oswald and published by HarperCollins between 2017 and 2021. The series includes seven books: The Bad Seed (2017), The Good Egg (2019), The Cool Bean (2019), The Couch Potato (2020), The Good Egg Presents: The Great Eggscape! (2020), The Smart Cookie (2021), and The Bad Seed Presents: The Good, the Bad, and the Spooky (2021), The Sour Grape (2022), and The Cool Bean Presents: As Cool as It Gets.

All five released books have been on The New York Times Bestseller List for children's picture books. The Good Egg landed the number one spot.

The Bad Seed 
The Bad Seed, initially published August 29, 2017, then republished May 8, 2018, is a children's book about self-acceptance.  

The book was a New York Times bestseller for children's picture books and received a starred review from School Library Journal, as well as the following accolades:

 Junior Library Guild selection
 Washington Children’s Choice Picture Book Award Nominee (2019)

 North Carolina Children's Book Award Final Nominee (2019)
 Los Angeles Public Library Best of 2017: Children’s Books

The Good Egg 
The Good Egg, published February 12, 2019, is a children's book about self-care.

The book landed the number one position on The New York Times bestseller list for children's pictures books. It received starred reviews from Kirkus Reviews and Booklist, as well as the following accolades:

 Junior Library Guild selection
Goodreads Choice Award Nominee for Picture Books (2019) 
NPR's Book Concierge Selection (2019) 
 Monarch Award Nominee (2021)

The Cool Bean 
The Cool Bean, published December 3, 2019, is a children's book about self-esteem. 

The book was a New York Times bestseller for children's picture books. It received a starred review from School Library Journal and was a Goodreads Choice Award Nominee for Picture Books in 2020.

The Good Egg Presents 
The Good Egg Presents: The Great Eggscape!, published February 11, 2020, is a children's book about teamwork. 

The book was a New York Times bestseller for children's picture books.

The Couch Potato 
The Couch Potato, published November 3, 2020, is a children's book about self-management.

The book was a New York Times bestseller for children's picture books, and Indie Bestseller, and an Indie Next List Selection.

The Bad Seed Presents 
The Bad Seed Presents: The Good, the Bad, and the Spooky was published July 27, 2021. 

The book was a New York Times bestseller for children's picture books.

The Smart Cookie 
The Smart Cookie was published November 2, 2021.

References

See also 

American children's books
American children's book series
American picture books
Book series introduced in 2017